P & A Campbell was a shipping company based in Bristol which operated steamship services in the Bristol Channel between 1893 and 1979.

History 
In the early 19th century, steamships were introduced to Europe with Clyde steamer sailings which grew rapidly, with many private ship owners taking trippers and commuters from Glasgow down the River Clyde to previously remote areas where holiday houses developed around the Firth of Clyde. Robert Campbell, known as "Captain Bob", came from a family associated with sailings to the Gare Loch. In 1854 he became master of the Gareloch steamboat Duchess of Argyle bought by two of his uncles, and developed a good public reputation as captain of successive ships as their fleet took on sailings from Kilmun on the Holy Loch. In 1864 one was sold as a Confederate blockade runner, its replacement Vivid was built to run "in connection with the express trains on the Greenock Railway".   

Captain Bob Campbell's sons Peter and Alexander Campbell were also captains, and when he suffered long term illness they took over running of the fleet. In 1887 their paddle steamer Waverley was taken by Peter to the Bristol Channel on a charter, with great success, after a shaky start when the Campbells were summoned before the Bristol Magistrates in July 1887 for having an uncertified engineer for the Waverley.

At this time the Caledonian Railway was extending the Greenock Railway to Gourock railway station and pier. In 1888 the Campbells agreed to sell them two of their steamers as the nucleus of the Caledonian Steam Packet Company, along with the goodwill of the Kilmun business. After Captain Bob died, Peter and Alexander Campbell moved their business to Bristol, and set up the White Funnel fleet for coastal cruising.

The company was formally formed in 1893 and they used the White Funnel image as a company logo. During the First World War, twelve of the fleet were requisitioned by the Admiralty as minesweepers and a troop ship. Two ships, Brighton Queen and Lady Ismay were lost.

During the Second World War the fleet was requisitioned again. They lasted until 1967 and 1968 respectively. After this the company used motor vessels until 1979 when it finally folded.

The company had a brief fling with high speed craft in the summer of 1963, using the experimental SRN2 as a ferry between Penarth and Weston-super-Mare.

Archives
Records of P & A Campbell are held at Bristol Archives (Ref. 37980) (online catalogue 1), (Ref. 40140) (online catalogue 2), (Ref. 40505) (online catalogue 3).

Vessels operated by Campbell

References

 

1887 establishments in England
Transport companies established in 1887
Transport companies disestablished in 1979
Defunct shipping companies of the United Kingdom
Defunct companies based in Bristol
1979 disestablishments in England
Bristol Channel